Dongwon Industries, Ltd. is a South Korean seafood company headquartered in Seoul, South Korea. Founded by Kim Jae-chul in 1969, it is the main representative of the Dongwon , a family conglomerate comprising 15 affiliates. Dongwon is South Korea's largest fishing company and the owner of StarKist Tuna. Kim Nam-jung, the son of Kim Jae-chul, serves as the current chairman and CEO of Dongwon Group.

Korea Investment Holdings, one of Korea's largest financial companies, was a financial branch of Dongwon Chaebol. The firm is now owned and managed by Kim Nam-goo, another son of Kim Jae-chul and billionaire investor in Korea.

References

External links
 

Fishing companies
Seafood companies of Asia
Fishing in South Korea
Food and drink companies of South Korea